The 1984 NCAA Division I Outdoor Track and Field Championships were contested May 28−June 2, 1984 at Hayward Field at the University of Oregon in Eugene, Oregon in order to determine the individual and team national champions of men's and women's collegiate Division I outdoor track and field events in the United States. 

These were the 62nd annual men's championships and the third annual women's championships. This was the Ducks' fifth time hosting the event and the first since 1978. 

Oregon and Florida State topped the men's and women's team standings, respectively; it was the Ducks' fifth men's team title and the first for the Seminole women.

Team results 
 Note: Top 10 only
 (H) = Hosts

Men's title

Women's title

References

NCAA Men's Outdoor Track and Field Championship
NCAA Division I Outdoor Track and Field Championships
NCAA
NCAA Division I Outdoor Track and Field Championships
NCAA Division I Outdoor Track and Field Championships
NCAA Women's Outdoor Track and Field Championship